Peter Fleming and John McEnroe were the defending champions but lost in the semifinals to Peter McNamara and Paul McNamee.

McNamara and McNamee defeated Bob Lutz and Stan Smith in the final, 7–6(7–5), 6–3, 6–7(4–7), 6–4 to win the gentlemen's doubles title at the 1980 Wimbledon Championships.

Seeds

  Peter Fleming /  John McEnroe (semifinals)
  Marty Riessen /  Sherwood Stewart (second round)
  Brian Gottfried /  Raúl Ramírez (quarterfinals)
  Bob Lutz /  Stan Smith (final)
  Wojciech Fibak /  Tom Okker (second round)
  Heinz Günthardt /  Frew McMillan (quarterfinals)
  Peter McNamara /  Paul McNamee (champions)
  Victor Amaya /  Hank Pfister (quarterfinals)
 n/a
  Andrew Pattison /  Butch Walts (first round)
  Tim Gullikson /  Tom Gullikson (second round)
  Anand Amritraj /  Vijay Amritraj (third round)
 n/a
  Buster Mottram /  Ilie Năstase (first round)
  John Sadri /  Tim Wilkison (third round)
  Rod Frawley /  Geoff Masters (third round)

Draw

Finals

Top half

Section 1

Section 2

Bottom half

Section 3

Section 4

References

External links

1980 Wimbledon Championships – Men's draws and results at the International Tennis Federation

Men's Doubles
Wimbledon Championship by year – Men's doubles